Antonín Panenka (born 2 December 1948) is a Czech retired footballer who played as an attacking midfielder. He spent most of his career representing Czechoslovak club Bohemians Prague. Panenka won UEFA Euro 1976 with the national team of Czechoslovakia. In the final against West Germany, he notably scored the winning penalty in the shootout with a softly-chipped ball up the middle of the goal as the goalkeeper dived away; a style of penalty now known as a panenka, named after him. In 1980, he won Czechoslovak Footballer of the Year and his team finished third at Euro 1980.

Club career 
An attacking midfielder known for the quality of his passing and his free kicks, Panenka played for Bohemians Praha for most of his career, joining the club in 1967. In 1981, Panenka left Bohemians for Austrian club Rapid Wien, where they won two Bundesliga titles and an Austrian Cup. In 1985 Rapid reached the UEFA Cup Winners' Cup final; Panenka played as a substitute, but his side lost 3–1 to Everton. Later that year, Panenka moved to VSE St. Pölten and played two more seasons before moving into the lower leagues in Austria, playing from 1987 to 1989 for Slovan Vienna, from 1989 to 1991 for ASV Hohenau and from 1991 to 1993 for Kleinwiesendorf.

Panenka penalty 

Panenka came to international prominence playing for Czechoslovakia at UEFA Euro 1976, where Czechoslovakia reached the final, facing West Germany. After extra time, the match finished 2–2, and so the first penalty shootout in a European Championships final ensued. The first seven kicks were converted until West Germany's fourth penalty taker, Uli Hoeneß, ballooned his shot over the bar. With the score 4–3, Panenka stepped up to take the fifth Czechoslovakian penalty, to win the match under immense pressure. He feigned shooting to the side of the goal, causing German goalkeeper Sepp Maier dive to his left, and then gently chipped the ball into the middle of the net. The sheer cheek of the goal led a watching French journalist to dub Panenka "a poet", and to this day his winning kick is one of the most famous ever, making Panenka's name synonymous with that particular style of penalty kick.

Since 1976 there have been numerous attempts to emulate Panenka, both successfully and others unsuccessfully, at every level of the sporting pyramid across the world, including in critical match winning moments such as international cup finals.

Post-playing career
Following his career, Panenka has worked as a president at former club Bohemians 1905. On 7 October 2020, the club confirmed that Panenka had been admitted to hospital and was in intensive care after testing positive for the novel coronavirus. By mid October, Panenka's condition had improved and he was discharged to continue his recovery at home.

Honours

Club
Rapid Wien
Austrian Bundesliga: 1981–82, 1982–83
Austrian Cup: 1982–83, 1983–84, 1984–85

International
Czechoslovakia
UEFA European Football Championship: 1976

Individual
UEFA European Football Championship Team of the Tournament: 1976
Czechoslovak Footballer of the Year: 1980
Golden Foot Legends Award: 2014

References

External links
 
 Antonín Panenka and his famous goal – photos
  – video
 Antonín Panenka with presidential nominee Jiří Dienstbier in Talk show Czech TV 8 November 2007

1948 births
Living people
Footballers from Prague
Czech footballers
Czechoslovak footballers
Association football midfielders
Bohemians 1905 players
SK Rapid Wien players
Austrian Football Bundesliga players
Czechoslovakia international footballers
UEFA Euro 1976 players
UEFA Euro 1980 players
1982 FIFA World Cup players
UEFA European Championship-winning players
Czechoslovak expatriate footballers
Czechoslovak expatriate sportspeople in Austria
Expatriate footballers in Austria
Recipients of Medal of Merit (Czech Republic)